Sassafras is an unincorporated community in Knott County, Kentucky, United States. Sassafras has a post office with ZIP code 41759.

References

Further reading

Unincorporated communities in Knott County, Kentucky
Unincorporated communities in Kentucky
Coal towns in Kentucky